The Zoghby Initiative was an ecumenical endeavour launched by Melkite Greek Catholic Church bishop Elias Zoghby whose goal was to allow inter-communion between the Melkites and the Antiochian Orthodox Church after a short period of dialogue.

1974 Melkite-Antiochian synods
Zoghby's ecumenical initiatives gained visibility in May 1974 with the exchange of visits between the Melkite Catholic and the Antiochian Orthodox synods, which met simultaneously in Lebanon. The proposal received much press, both positive and negative. Numerous ecumenists lauded the initiative, while some theologians and canonists were critical. Despite the mixed reception, the initiative helped create a new climate of dialogue on East–West reunification and communion.  The proposal itself, however, was rejected outright by the Greek Orthodox Patriarchate of Antioch at a special Synod convened specifically to denounce the initiative.

1996 book
Zoghby asserted in his 1996 book Tous Schismatiques? (literally, "Are We All Schismatics?", usually translated "We Are All Schismatics") that the Church of Rome and the Orthodox Church share essentially the same faith. He declared that the Councils held by the West alone cannot be considered "ecumenical", criticized the Code of Canon Law of the Eastern Catholic Church, and said that the union which took place between some Eastern Churches and Rome was a mistake. Zoghby also asserted that the primacy of the Roman Pontiff is one of honor and charity only.  Later, he said that papal "infallibility depends on ecumenicity."

Support for double communion
Decrying the fissure between East and West, he said that "to prolong the schism is to remain in sin."  Zoghby called for the Melkite Catholic Church to adopt "double communion" with both Rome and the Orthodox. Melkite Archbishop Cyril Salim Boustros, who succeeded Zoghby as eparch of Baalbek, said that while issues exist between the Eastern Catholic Churches and the Holy See, that "we could not conclude that our forefathers committed a mistake by proclaiming their union to Rome."

Zoghby called Tous Schismatiques? a "livre-choc" (literally, a shock-book), designed to stimulate discussion of the issue of his proposed communion. The book was dismissed by some in the Catholic Church as a very personal position with little merit; it was well received by other Catholics and Orthodox.

Current status of the plan
So far, neither the Catholic Church nor the Orthodox Church has accepted the Zoghby initiative. Speaking for the Catholic Church, Cardinal Joseph Ratzinger (now Pope Emeritus Benedict XVI) commented that "premature, unilateral initiatives are to be avoided, where the eventual results may not have been sufficiently considered." The Antiochian Orthodox Church was circumspect toward his initiative, declaring in October 1996 that "our Synod believes that inter-communion cannot be separated from the unity of faith. Moreover, inter-communion is the last step in the quest for unity and not the first."

However, certain Orthodox leaders praised Zoghby's candor and goals; Bishop Vsevolod Maidansky of the Ukrainian Orthodox Church of the USA, for example, wrote that Zoghby "invites us all to an ecumenical metanoia, a change in our hearts from the habit of seeking even more excuses to refrain from Eucharistic Communion." Although Zoghby's proposal of double communion has not been accepted by the Catholic Church or the Orthodox Church, the initiative focused greater attention on ecumenical discussions and renewed efforts for East–West unity.

References

Catholic–Eastern Orthodox ecumenism
Melkite Greek Catholic Church
Greek Orthodox Church of Antioch